Penmaenmawr railway station serves the town of Penmaenmawr, Wales, and is located on the  to  North Wales Coast Line,  west of Chester. The station is a request stop.

History

The local granite quarries are a major source stone aggregate railway traffic especially for road building and railway maintenance purposes. Transfer sidings for this traffic are located next to the station and are controlled from the station signal box. This had to be relocated following a fatal accident at the station in August 1950. Six people were killed when a goods train undertaking shunting operations at the station in the early hours was inadvertently diverted onto the main line, where it collided with the fast-moving eastbound Irish Mail express from Holyhead. The poor view afforded of the sidings from the old box was cited as one of the contributory factors to the accident.

An earlier accident occurred near Penmaenmawr on 12 January 1899 when an express freight train was derailed because a storm had washed away the trackbed. Both locomotive crew were killed.

Facilities

The station is unstaffed, though it has kept its original Grade-II listed buildings on the westbound platform - these are now used as private residential accommodation. No ticket machine is provided, so all tickets must be purchased prior to travel or on the train. A waiting shelter is located on the eastbound platform, whilst canopies provide a covered waiting area on the opposite side. Train running information is offered via telephone, digital CIS displays and timetable posters. No level access is available to either platform, as the approach ramps on both sides are steeply graded and the footbridge linking the platforms has steps.

Services 

Additional trains call during the morning peak and in the late afternoon/early evening.

Sunday services from the station are infrequent (particularly in winter), with sizeable gaps between trains.

Notes

Further reading

External links 

Penmaenmawr
Railway stations in Conwy County Borough
DfT Category F1 stations
Railway request stops in Great Britain
Former London and North Western Railway stations
Railway stations in Great Britain opened in 1849
Railway stations served by Transport for Wales Rail
1849 establishments in Wales
Grade II listed railway stations in Wales
1950 disasters in the United Kingdom